Zinterol is a beta-adrenergic agonist. 

Its structure is based on soterenol (antiarrhythmic) and phentermine.

References

Sulfonamides
Phenols
Phenylethanolamines